This is a list of Roman villas currently located in Belgium. It is ordered by province. Links in bold direct to a page specifically on that villa; ordinary links link to an article on the town or village in or near which that villa is sited.

By province

Antwerp

Hombeek, Mechelen
Leest, Mechelen
Mortsel
Muizen, Mechelen
Vorst, Laakdal

Brabant (Flemish)
Asbeek, Asse
Attenhoven, Holsbeek
Bierbeek
Hoegaarden
Meldert, Hoegaarden
Merchtem
Wange, Landen
Wemmel

Brabant (Walloon)
Basse-Wavre, Wavre
Céroux-Mousty, Ottignies-Louvain-la-Neuve
Chastre
Cortil-Noirmont, Chastre
Grez, Grez-Doiceau
Sclimpré, Mélin, Jodoigne / Wahenge, Beauvechain
Thines, Nivelles
Tombe, Tourinnes-Saint-Lambert, Walhain (Roman vicus)
Villeroux, Chastre

Brussels
Biestebroeck, Anderlecht
Jette
 Chaussée d'Haecht Schaerbeek

East Flanders
Belsele, Sint-Niklaas
Blandijnberg, Ghent
Denderwindeke, Ninove
Etikhove, Maarkedal
Heldergem, Haaltert
Hofstade, Aalst
Michelbeke, Brakel
Scheldewindeke, Oosterzele
Velzeke, Zottegem

Hainaut
Auberchies, Beloeil
Basècles, Beloeil
Biercée, Thuin
Blaton, Bernissart
Blicquy, Leuze-en-Hainaut (Roman vicus)
Bruyelle, Antoing
Cambron, Brugelette
Chièvres
Estinnes-au-Val, Estinnes
Farciennes
Froyennes, Tournai
Gerpinnes
Gilly, Charleroi
Gosselies, Charleroi
Ghislengien, Ath
Hautrage, Saint-Ghislain
Kennelée, Antoing
Maffle, Ath
Merbes-le-Château
Meslin-l'Évêque, Ath
Montignies-sur-Sambre, Charleroi
Moranfayt, Dour
Motte, Onnezies-Montignies-sur-Roc, Honnelles
Moustier, Frasnes-lez-Anvaing
Péruwelz
Popuelles, Celles
Sart, Mons
Soignies (two villae, one in la Coulbrie and the "balneum" of l'Espesse)
Solre-Saint-Gery, Beaumont
Solre-sur-Sambre, Erquelinnes
Strepy, La Louvière
Tiripré, Ladeuze, Chièvres
Nouvelles, Mons

Liège
Acosse, Wasseiges
Anthisnes
Autuaxhe, Waremme
Awans
Bertrée, Hannut
Borsu, Clavier
Chokier, Flémalle
Corswarem, Berloz
Crisnée
Deidenberg, Amel
Haccourt-Froidmont, Liège
Herstal, Liège (2 villae)
Heure-le-Romain, Oupeye
Hody, Anthisnes
Jupille, Liège
Kemexhe, Crisnée
Place Saint-Lambert, Liège
Lincent, Waremme
Marchin
Odeur, Crisnée
Ramelot, Tinlot
Vaux, Vaux-et-Borset, Villers-le-Bouillet
Vervoz, Ocquier, Clavier
Villers-le-Bouillet
Villers-le-Temple, Nandrin
Villes-en-Hesbaye, Braives

Limburg
Bilzen
Broekom, Borgloon
Gingelom
's-Gravenvoeren, Voeren
Hoeselt
Kleine Spouwen, Bilzen
Lafelt, Riemst
Meerberg, Val-Meer, Riemst
Montenaken, Gingelom
Piringen, Tongeren
Rekem-Neerharen, Lanaken
Rosmeer, Bilzen
Sint-Truiden
Vechmaal, Heers

Luxembourg
Amberloup, Sainte-Ode (Roman vicus)
Chelche, Hollange, Fauvillers
Dampicourt, Rouvroy
Hachy, Habay
Heckbous, Arlon
Hollogne, Waha, Marche-en-Famenne
Lionfaing, Vaux-sur-Sûre
Mageroy, Habay-la-Vieille, Habay
Nadrin, Houffalize
Remagne, Libramont-Chevigny
Rémichampagne, Hompré, Vaux-sur-Sûre
Rettigny, Cherain, Gouvy
Robelmont, Meix-devant-Virton
Sainte-Marie-Chevigny, Libramont-Chevigny
Schockville, Attert
Tintange, Fauvillers (Roman vicus)
Vaux, Cherain, Gouvy

Namur
Baillonville, Somme-Leuze
Barcène, Ciney
Barvaux-Condroz, Havelange
Berlacominne, Vedrin, Namur
Bruyère, Leignon, Ciney
Chapois, Leignon, Ciney
Chardeneux-Bonsin, Somme-Leuze
Chestruvin, Onhaye
Conneux, Ciney
Corria, Gesves
Eve, Evelette, Ohey
Flavion, Florennes
Flawinne, Namur
Fontaine, Anthée, Onhaye
Frasnes, Couvin
Furfooz, Dinant
Gourdinne, Walcourt
Haut-le-Wastia, Anhée
Hemptinne, Fernelmont
Le Hody, Champion-Emptinne, Hamois
Lisogne, Dinant
Lustin, Profondeville (Roman castrum)
Maffe, Havelange
Maillen, Assesse (four villae, in Arche, Maharée, Ronchinne and Sauvenière)
Malagne, Rochefort
Matagne, Ohey
Matagne-la-Grande, Doische
Miécret, Havelange
Mohiville, Hamois
Morville, Florennes
Reumont, Malonne, Namur
Roly, Philippeville
Tahier, Evelette, Ohey
Treignes, Viroinval
Try-Hallot, Saint-Gérard, Mettet
Vezin-Namêchte, Andenne
Wancennes, Gedinne

West Flanders
Heestert, Zwevegem
Kerkhove, Avelgem
Kooigem, Kortrijk
Tiegem, Anzegem
Velzeke, Kruishoutem
Wervik

Related links
Archeoforum of Liège - Archéoforum
Villa Romaine de Basse-Wavre
Villa romaine de Malagne
Map of Gallo-Roman cities, towns, villas, forts and tumuli in Belgium

See also
Gallo-Roman culture
List of oppida in the Low Countries

References

Belgium
Villa
 
Roman villas
Roman